Élisa Koch or Elisa Kock (1833–1914) was an Italian painter and pastellist.

Koch was born in Livorno and studied under Louis Janmot and Charles Comte. She exhibited in Lyons from 1854 to 1855 and in Paris from 1863 showing most notably Dangerous Encounter at the Paris Salon of 1868, You'll Have None of It at the Paris Salon of 1874, Misfortune at the Paris Salon of 1881, and Portrait of Mademoiselle Juliette Dodu. Her work The Little Sister was included in the book Women Painters of the World, published in 1905.

References

1833 births
1914 deaths
People from Livorno
Italian women painters
19th-century Italian painters
19th-century Italian women artists
Pastel artists